John Reilly may refer to:

Sports
John Reilly (baseball) (1858–1937), American baseball player
John Reilly (footballer, born 1962), Scottish former professional footballer
John Reilly (Australian footballer) (born 1942), former Australian rules footballer
John Reilly (football coach), Irish football manager

Politics and government
John Reilly (Pennsylvania politician) (1836–1904), U.S. Representative from Pennsylvania
John Reilly (Michigan politician) (born 1958), member of the Michigan House of Representatives
John Reilly, North Carolina State Auditor, 1873–1877
John E. Reilly Jr. (1902–1963), American politician and judge
John R. Reilly (1928–2008), adviser to Democratic presidential candidates
John Reilly (judge) (born 1946), Canadian politician, activist and retired judge
John B. Reilly (1870–1928), mayor of Miami
John Reilly (Irish politician), Irish MP

Entertainment
John Reilly (singer) (1926–1969), Irish traveller and source singer
John Reilly (actor, born 1934) (1934–2021), American actor
John C. Reilly (born 1965), American actor

Other
John Reilly (lawyer), American lawyer, author and businessman
John Reily (1763–1850), American pioneer

See also
Jack Reilly (disambiguation)
John Riley (disambiguation)